Calvin Jung (born February 17, 1945) is an American actor who is best known for his appearances in the films The Day After, RoboCop and Lethal Weapon 4.

Career

1970's: Early work
In the 1970s, Jung appeared in the "Ancient Chinese Secret" commercials for Calgon. Prior to his career in movies and television, Jung appeared in several plays of note in New York. He acted in Frank Chin's The Chickencoop Chinaman, the first play written by an Asian American to be produced by a major New York company, The American Place Theatre. Jung also appeared in Tina Howe's Museum, and David Henry Hwang's FOB. On Broadway, Jung has appeared in three plays, all in one calendar year. Jung made his debut in two plays only two days apart; he appeared in the Arthur Miller one-act A Memory of Two Mondays on January 26, 1976, and appeared in a revival of They Knew What They Wanted by Sidney Howard the following night. Both productions were running in repertoire on Broadway until March of that year. By the end of 1976, Jung was back on Broadway in Sly Fox, an adaptation by Larry Gelbart of work by Ben Jonson.

Filmography

References

External links

1945 births
Living people
20th-century American male actors
Male actors from New York City
American male film actors